IPBA may refer to:

 Inter-Pacific Bar Association
 Indian Professional Boxing Association